Astra 2A is one of the Astra communications satellites owned by Société Européenne des Satellites. Launched in 1998 into the 28.2° East orbital position, half its expected end-of-life capacity of 28 transponders were pre-booked by BSkyB, who utilised it to launch their new Sky Digital service. In March 2015, the satellite has been deactivated and relocated to 113.5° East.

History 
The satellite suffered pre-launch technical issues with its apogee motors and was moved to a launch by the Proton-K / DM-03 rather than the Ariane 5, as the Proton can inject directly in geostationary orbit (GEO).

When positioned at 28.2 East, it joined DFS Kopernikus-1, which served mainly Eastern Europe. The satellite was the first of Astra's craft to never carry analogue television services (with the exception of a solitary test card in 1999 ), and as of 2006, carried standard definition digital television, digital radio, and high-definition digital television, as well as Sky Interactive streams and the AVC Broadband and Silvermead satellite Internet services. Two beams "2A North" and "2A South" transmit on horizontal and vertical polarisation. The South beam covers almost all of Europe, with the North beam covering only Northern Europe at a high power.

In March 2015, two years beyond Astra 2A's projected lifespan, and following the launches of Astra 2E in 2013, Astra 2F in 2012, and Astra 2G in 2014 to 28.2° East, all remaining traffic was transferred from Astra 2A to the newer satellites. From 25 March 2015, Astra 2A remained at 28.2° East, inactive, and was expected to be moved to Astra 23.5°E to operate as a backup satellite to Astra 3B but in the summer of 2016 it was instead moved to 113.5°E. In July 2018, Astra 2A started moving west at approximately 0.6°/day  to arrive at its new position of 100° East in August 2018. In May 2020, Astra 2A started moving west at approx 0.8°/day. and in the autumn 2020, it was back at 28.2°E. The satellite was moved to 57.2°E in 2022

See also 

 Astra 2E
 Astra 2F
 Astra 2G
 Astra 2B
 Astra 2C
 Astra 2D
 Astra 28.2°E main lifetime orbital position

References

External links 
 
 
 SES fleet information and map
 Official SES site

Astra satellites
Communications satellites in geostationary orbit
Satellites using the BSS-601 bus
Spacecraft launched in 1998
1998 in Luxembourg
Satellites of Luxembourg